Astra Linux is a Russian Linux-based computer operating system (OS) that is being widely deployed in the Russian Federation in order to replace Microsoft Windows. Initially it was created and developed to meet the needs of the Russian army, other armed forces and intelligence agencies. It provides data protection up to the level of "top secret" in Russian classified information grade by featuring mandatory access control. It has been officially certified by Russian Defense Ministry, Federal Service for Technical and Export Control and Federal Security Service.

In the course of 2010s, as Russian authorities and industry were trying to lower dependence on Western products ("import substitution industrialization"), Astra Linux became widely used by Russian civilians as a universal operating system for personal computers. Aside from army and police, it is now being supplied to educational, healthcare and other state institutions, as well as in industry giants such as RZD, Gazprom, Rosatom and others. Server versions of Astra Linux are certified to work with Huawei equipment.

Specifications 
The creator of the OS is the Scientific/Manufacturing Enterprise Rusbitech which is applying solutions according to Russian Government decree No.2299-р of 17/10/2010 that orders federal authorities and budget institutions to implement Free Software use.

There are two available editions of the OS: the main one is called "Special Edition" and the other one is called "Common Edition".
The main differences between the two are the fact that the former is paid, while the latter is free; the former is available for x86-64 architecture, ARM architecture and Elbrus architecture, while the latter is only available for x86-64 architecture; the former has a security certification and provides 3 levels of OS security (which are named after Russian cities and which from the lowest to the highest are: Oryol, Voronezh and Smolensk), while the latter doesn't have the security certification and only provides the lowest level of OS security (Oryol).

Rusbitech also manufactures a "soft/hardware trusted boot control module" MAKSIM-M1 ("М643М1") with PCI bus. It prevents unauthorized access and offers some other raised digital security features. The module, besides Astra Linux, also supports OSes with Linux kernel 2.6.x up to 5.x.x, as well as several Microsoft Windows OSes.

It is declared the Astra Linux licenses correspond with Russian and international laws and "don't contradict with the spirit and demands of GPL license". The system uses .deb packages.

Astra Linux is a recognized Debian derivative. Rusbitech has partnership relations with The Linux Foundation. It was part of the advisory board of The Document Foundation, but was suspended on 26 February 2022 because of the Russian invasion of Ukraine.

Use 
The Special Edition version (paid) is used in many Russian state-related organizations. Particularly, it is used in the Russian National Center for Defence Control.

There are talks to deploy mass use of Astra Linux in many state institutions of the Republic of Crimea – legitimate use of other popular OSes is questionable because of international sanctions during the Russo-Ukrainian War.

Also there were plans on cooperation of Rusbitech and Huawei.

In January 2018, it was announced that Astra Linux was going to be deployed to all Russian Army computers, and Microsoft Windows will be dropped.

In February 2018, Rusbitech announced it has ported Astra Linux to Russian-made Elbrus microprocessors.

In February 2019, Astra Linux was announced to be implemented at Tianwan Nuclear Power Plant in China.

Since 2019 "super-protected" tablet computers branded MIG are available with Astra Linux, smartphones are expected.

In 2019 Gazprom national gas/oil holding announced Astra Linux implementation, in 2020 nuclear corporation Rosatom, in early 2021 Russian Railways was reported to do so.

In 2020, Astra Linux sold more than a million copies in licenses and generated 2 billion rubles in sales.

In 2021, several Russian nuclear power plants and subsidiaries of Rosatom are planned to switch to Astra Linux, with a total of 15000 users.

Following the 2022 Russian invasion of Ukraine, and subsequent departure of Microsoft from the Russian market, Astra Linux announced that it was planning to be publicly listed on the Moscow Exchange, although it has not yet given a planned timeline.

Version history

See also
 Unity Operating System, a Linux distribution planned to be used on Chinese government computers
 List of Debian-based Linux distributions

References 

X86-64 Linux distributions
Debian-based distributions
Linux distributions
Russian-language Linux distributions
State-sponsored Linux distributions